V-Key is a software-based digital security provider. Headquartered in Singapore, it provides products to financial institutions, mobile payment providers and governments to implement cloud-based payments, authentication for mobile banking, and secured mobile applications for user access and data protection.

Background & founders 
V-Key was founded in 2011 by entrepreneurs Eddie Chau, Benjamin Mah and Joseph Gan. Eddie Chau, who are the founders of digital agency Brandtology, acquired by iSentia in 2014, started V-Key primarily to secure mobile devices and applications with patented technology.

Benjamin Mah is the co-founder and chief executive officer of V-Key. He was general manager at e-Cop (acquired by a wholly owned subsidiary of Temasek Holdings) and regional director at Encentuate (acquired by IBM), before he co-founded V-Key. He is a concurrently venture partner of Venture Craft, chairman of Jump Start Asia and a mentor at UOB Finlabs.

Joseph Gan is the third co-founder of V-Key. Before joining V-Key, he was at the Center for Strategic Info comm Technologies (CSIT) as the head of the Cryptography Lab, where he oversaw research and development into cryptographic software for the Ministry of Defence (Singapore).

Companies that have funded V-Key are IPV Capital and Ant Financial Services, which runs the Alipay mobile wallet app.

Technology 
V-Key provides security to businesses to support cloud-based payments, digital identity and authentication for mobile banking as well as other secured mobile applications via its core technology—V-OS.

V-Key's partners are financial institutions, governments and mobile payment providers in various markets. Its technology has been used by:
 ChinaPnR - financial payment provider: V-Key integrates a virtual secure element into "ChinaPnR POS Acquirer" (Point-of-Sale payment acquisition query platform) to protect mobile applications' runtime environment, program logic and important data.

See also 
 Application Security
 Encryption
 Cryptographic Key Types

References 

Companies of Singapore
Technology companies of Singapore
Mobile security
Data security
Data protection